Golden road may refer to:
 Golden Road (album), by Keith Urban
 Golden Road, a part of the Topkapı Palace
 Golden Ring Road, Maryland Route 588
 Golden road, a fictional element in The Wizard of Mars
 Golden Road, a pricing game on The Price Is Right
 Golden Road (Maine), a 97-mile long private road into the Maine north woods
 A fantasy novel trilogy by Larry Niven and Jerry Pournelle; part of the world of the novel The Magic Goes Away
 Golden Road Brewing, a brand of Anheuser-Busch InBev

See also
 The Golden Road (disambiguation)